The Men's 4 × 100 metre medley relay competition at the 2019 World Championships was held on 28 July 2019. The final was won by the British team in a European record time of three minutes, 28.10 seconds.

Records
Prior to the competition, the existing world and championship records were as follows.

Results

Heats
The heats were held on 28 July at 10:50.

Final
The final was held on 28 July at 21:38.

References

Men's 4 x 100 metre medley relay